Damera a surname. Notable people with the surname include:

Damerla Chennappa Nayakudu or Damerla Chennapa Nayakudu, Nayakudu of Vandavasi who served as a general under Sriranga Deva Raya of the Aravidu Dynasty. 
Dipika Damerla, politician in Ontario, Canada
Damerla Rama Rao, Indian artist

Surnames of Indian origin